Rockland is an unincorporated community in Hardy County, West Virginia, United States. Originally, the community was known as Rockland Mills. Rockland is located within Trout Run Valley in the George Washington National Forest.

References

Unincorporated communities in Hardy County, West Virginia
Unincorporated communities in West Virginia